Kazy-Yeldyak (Qaźı-Yäldäk) is a rural locality (a village) in Staroyantuzovsky Selsoviet, Dyurtyulinsky District, Bashkortostan, Russia. The population was 273 as of 2010. There are 4 streets.

Geography 
Kazy-Yeldyak is located 28 km northeast of Dyurtyuli (the district's administrative centre) by road. Baygildy is the nearest rural locality.

References 

Rural localities in Dyurtyulinsky District